The Ven. George Frederick Temple (16 March 1933 – 8 January 2003) was Archdeacon of Bodmin from 1981  until 1989

Temple studied for ordination at Wells Theological College. After curacies in Guildford and Penzance he held incumbencies at Penwith, Penryn and Saltash before his appointment as Archdeacon

References

1933 births
2003 deaths
Alumni of Wells Theological College
Archdeacons of Bodmin